Tanta District is one of thirty-three districts of the province Yauyos in Peru. Its seat is the village Tanta.

Geography 
The Cordillera Central traverses the district. Some of the highest mountains of the district are listed below:

See also 
 Ch'uspiqucha
 Khuchi Mach'ay
 Mulluqucha
 Pawqarqucha
 Pirqa Pirqa
 Pisququcha
 Tikllaqucha

References